Satanic Warmaster is a Finnish black metal project from Lappeenranta, Finland, consisting of the sole musician "Werwolf" (real name Lauri Penttilä). Penttilä began recording under this name in 1998. Satanic Warmaster has sold tens of thousands of albums worldwide without the support of any major distribution companies or record labels. The band has toured around the world in countries such as Finland, Germany, Russia, Mexico, Japan and Italy. In November 2014, Satanic Warmaster's album "Fimbulwinter" reached the Finnish official chart on place #14  and the Rumba specialized stores' chart on place #2.

Lyrical themes 
Satanic Warmaster's lyrics deal mainly with nature, folklore, Satanism, and "occult and warlike themes". In a Q&A session in 2014 on the official Satanic Warmaster website, Werwolf answered questions from his fans for 24 hours, where he revealed a chart presenting all the lyrical themes and messages in his songs throughout the band's existence up to 2014. The chart had Satan, death and "spiritual rebellion" as three of the most important themes in his music, and against common misconceptions, dismissed the rumor that his music was ever involved in the National Socialist black metal ideology, citing that racism and Nazism were never dealt with as focal themes of any his songs. In 2009, Ylioppilaslehti, the biggest student newspaper in Finland, published an article about black metal which featured an interview with Werwolf. In the interview he explained his lyrical aesthetics even further.

Ideology 
In a 2003 interview for the Finnish metal webzine Imperiumi, Werwolf explained his personal beliefs in a detailed manner: "Pan-European traditional Satanism is a comprehensive ideological and philosophical alignment, which aims for the bettering of an individual and the most beneficial elbow space through the acknowledgement (and partially harnessing) of the dark and destructive (and thus initially creative) force of nature and cosmos. Excluding anything has never been the best option. Satanism constitutes my world view about 100%". In context to his music he explained the reflection of his ideology into his music even further: "Lyrically Satanic Warmaster is a reflection of the Luciferian spirit through the eyes of a young man. I deal with subjects personally and mainly in a very symbolic way. For example I've written symbolic tales of creation and rebirth influenced by folklore, and totalist and elitist visions of what Black Metal's brotherhood should be like. I'm driven to do all this by the flame that burns in my music, the (artistic) aspirations of a man and the light of the black star of the dark lord of nature". In January 2015 Werwolf explained his ideology and the protests towards his music even further, "If someone becomes a “nazi” just by working with or hanging around “the wrong kind of people”, should it not be true in all possible contexts? Unless it is all about the effort of trying to sand down the sharpest edges of modern music. Personally, I could never tie Satanic Warmaster down to the concept of NSBM for the reasons that have been there from 1998: It would not coincide with my conviction and the thoughts I want to convey through my music. To see me crush all the chains of an Abrahamic religion and proclaim my victory in the most insulting way possible, or me seeing good, evil, or lies where, according to political correctness, none should exist, it takes a twisted mind to see all this as a reflection of some political dogma. As I have said before and will say once again: The ideology behind Satanic Warmaster is Satanism and the musical style is black metal. Those, who claim otherwise, do it on the basis of their own feelings and
resentment".

Members

Current members 
 Werwolf (Lauri Penttilä) – vocals, all instruments (1998–present)

Former members 
 Lord War Torech – guitars (2000-2005)

Live members 
 Vholm – drums
 Pete Talker – bass
 Fyrdkal – guitars

Former session members 
 Lord Sargofagian – drums
 Nigrantium – session drums
 T. H. – guitars

Discography

Studio albums 
 [o futuro é pica] (2001)
 Opferblut (2003)
 Carelian Satanist Madness (2005)
 Nachzehrer (2010)
 Fimbulwinter (2014)
 Aamongandr (2022)

EPs 
 Black Katharsis (2002)
 ...Of the Night (2004)
 Revelation (2007)
 Ondskapens Makt / Forgotten Graves (2010)
 Winter's Hunger / Torches (2011)
 In Eternal Fire / Ghost Wolves (2012)

Split releases 
 2003 – Hold On to Your Dreams (single; split with Krieg)
 2003 – The True Face of Evil (single; split with The True Frost)
 2004 – March of the Legion Werwolf (EP; split with Akitsa)
 2004 – Satanic Warmaster & Clandestine Blaze (album; split with Clandestine Blaze)
 2006 – A Hymn for the Black Empire (single; split with Stuthoff)
 2007 – The Chant of the Barbarian Wolves (single; split with Aryan Blood)
 2007 – Dark Hymns (EP; split with Mütiilation & Drowning the Light)
 2008 – Southern / Carelian Black Metal Holocaust (single; split with Evil)
 2008 – Where Eternity Awaits (EP; split with Behexen)
 2009 – Majesty of Wampyric Blood (single; split with Totenburg)
 2015 – Lux Satanae (Thirteen Hymns of Finnish Devil Worship) (album; split with Archgoat)

Other 
 2000 – Bloody Ritual (demo)
 2005 – Black Metal Kommando / Gas Chamber (compilation)
 2007 – Black Metal Massacre Live (live recording)
 2007 – Werewolf Hate Attack (live recording)
 2008 – Revelation ...of the Night (compilation)
 2010 – We Are the Worms that Crawl on the Broken Wings of an Angel (compilation)
 2014 – Death Live 2012 (live recording 2012)
 2014 – Luciferian Torches (compilation)

References

External links 
 
 Satanic Warmaster at Discogs
 Satanic Warmaster biography @ MusicMight

Finnish black metal musical groups
Musical groups established in 1999
People from Lappeenranta
1999 establishments in Finland
Black metal controversies
Satanism and Nazism